Pink Lightning may refer to:
Pink Lightning, a Pink Panther animated short
"Pink Lightning", a song by Purity Ring from their 2020 album Womb